Xanthochilus is a genus of true bugs belonging to the family Rhyparochromidae. Xanthochilus is often considered a subgenus of Rhyparochromus.

Species
Species within Xanthochilus include:
 Xanthochilus creticus Josifov, 1963
 Xanthochilus douglasi (Fieber, 1864)
 Xanthochilus kangricus (Kirkaldy, 1907)
 Xanthochilus melanopus Kiritshenko & Scudder, 1973
 Xanthochilus minusculus (Reuter, 1885)
 Xanthochilus omissus (Horvath, 1911)
 Xanthochilus persicellus (Kirkaldy, 1909)
 Xanthochilus quadratus (Fabricius, 1798)
 Xanthochilus saturnius Rossi, 1790
 Xanthochilus turanicus (Wagner, 1961)
 Xanthochilus vittiger Kiritshenko & Scudder, 1973

References

Pentatomomorpha genera
Lygaeoidea